MindChamps is an early childhood educator headquartered in Singapore. It is the first early childhood educator to list on the Singapore Exchange (SGX).

Its pedagogy is based on the research of neuroscientist Allan Snyder from the University of Sydney, which included Snyder's study of the Champion Mindset.

Based in Singapore and Leichhardt, an Inner West suburb of Sydney, in New South Wales, Australia, it primarily offers infant care and bilingual academic programs, nursery, and kindergarten services.

History 
MindChamps was founded in Australia in 1998 as an educational research centre in Sydney, by Australian David Chiem. In 2008, it opened its first preschool in Singapore. It subsequently expanded its number of schools through a mix of company-owned, company operated centres, and as well as franchising.

In 2015, MindChamps opened a franchise in the Philippines.

In 2016, it launched its first Chinese preschool in Singapore.

In 2017, MindChamps acquired a 50 percent stake in Actors Centre Australia. The company was publicly listed on the Singapore Exchange (SGX) in November 2017, making it the only childhood education provider to be listed on SGX. In 2018, it expanded into Malaysia through a master franchise agreement signed with Victoria Education.

In 2019, it opened its first preschool in Myanmar.

In 2021, MindChamps entered a joint venture with Kuo Po, director of Academie of Stars to form MindChamps Academie of Stars, of which MindChamps holds a 70 percent stake in the joint venture.

In 2021, MindChamps established a joint venture company with Indonesia's Mayapada Group to bring MindChamps’ schools to Indonesia.

References 

Educational organisations based in Singapore
1998 establishments in Australia
Companies listed on the Singapore Exchange